This is a discography of American musician Ray Charles.

Overview 
Ray Charles first appeared on a Billboard chart in 1949, when — as part of the Maxin Trio with G.D. McKee and Milton Garred — he charted his first single with "Confession Blues." It reached No. 2 on the R&B chart, then called the Most-Played Juke Box Race Records. In 1952, Charles signed with Atlantic Records and went on to top Billboards pop, country, R&B, jazz, and dance charts.

In the early 1960s, after leaving Atlantic Records to sign with ABC–Paramount, he negotiated for ownership of his own master recordings. He also established his own labels. Tangerine came first, which later evolved into CrossOver Records. As a songwriter, Charles penned nearly 200 songs. He also operated his own publishing companies, Tangerine Music and Racer Music.

On the Billboard Hot 100, Charles had 80 hits between 1958 (the year the chart began) and 1990, when "I'll Be Good to You" became his last Hot 100 single, reaching No. 18. His biggest hit, "I Can't Stop Loving You", spent five weeks at No. 1 in 1962. He also topped the Hot 100 with the singles "Hit the Road Jack" and "Georgia on My Mind". Among all acts, he charted the third-most singles on the Hot 100; only Elvis Presley (with 108) and James Brown (91) had more.

On Billboards R&B chart, Charles had 86 hits, including 11 chart-toppers such as "I've Got a Woman", "What'd I Say (Part 1)", "Hit the Road Jack", and "You Are My Sunshine."

Charles also reached No. 1 on the Hot Country Songs chart in 1985 with "Seven Spanish Angels", a duet with Willie Nelson. The single appears on Charles' duets album, Friendship, which reached No. 1 on Top Country Albums. His 1962 album, Modern Sounds in Country and Western Music, became his first album to top the Billboard 200.

In 1990, Charles had a No. 1 on the Hot Dance Club Songs chart with "I'll Be Good to You", a collaboration with Quincy Jones and Chaka Khan.

Albums

The Atlantic years

The ABC years

1973–2004

Posthumous albums

Compilations
Hundreds of Ray Charles compilations and "Greatest Hits/Best Of" albums have been released and continue to be produced and released by various labels around the world.  Some of the more notable compilations include:

1958: Ray Charles (Coronet)
1959: The Original Ray Charles (Hollywood)
1959: The Fabulous Ray Charles (Hollywood)
1961: Do the Twist! with Ray Charles (Atlantic) [reissued as The Greatest Ray Charles]
1962: The Ray Charles Story, Volume One (Atlantic)
1962: The Ray Charles Story, Volume Two (Atlantic)
1963: The Ray Charles Story, Volume Three (Atlantic)
1964: The Ray Charles Story, Volume Four (Atlantic)
1967: A Man And His Soul (ABC)
1970: The Best of Ray Charles (Atlantic) (BPI: Silver)
1971: A 25th Anniversary in Show Business Salute to Ray Charles (ABC)
1973: Ray Charles Live (Atlantic)
1978: The Tender Side of Ray Charles (Suffolk Marketing, Inc.)
1980: Heart to Heart (Endeavour) (AUS #46)
1987: Ray Charles – His Greatest Hits, Volume 1/Volume 2 (DCC Compact Classics)
1988: Ray Charles Anthology (Rhino) [1960–1972 ABC material]
1989: Seven Spanish Angels and Other Hits (Columbia)
1990: The Collection (Castle Communications) (AUS #34)
1991: The Classic Years (Castle Communications) (AUS #19)
1991: The Birth of Soul: The Complete Atlantic R&B Recordings 1952–1959 (Atlantic)
1993: Ray Charles – Blues + Jazz (Rhino)
1994: The Best of Ray Charles: The Atlantic Years (Rhino)
1995: Jazz & Blues Collection, Vol. 3 (Charly/Editions Atlas)
1997: Genius & Soul: The 50th Anniversary Collection (Rhino)
1997: The Complete Swing Time & Down Beat Recordings 1949–1952 (Night Train International)
1998: The Complete Country & Western Recordings, 1959–1986 (Rhino)
1999: Ultimate Hits Collection (Rhino/WEA)
2000: The Very Best of Ray Charles, Volume 1/Volume 2 (Rhino/WEA)
2001: The Definitive Ray Charles (Rhino/WEA) (BPI: Gold)
2002: Ray Charles Sings for America (Rhino) 
2003: Ray Charles in Concert (Rhino Handmade)
2004: RAY (Rhino/WEA) (AUS #7) (BPI: Gold)
2004: The Best of Ray Charles Live (Essentials)
2005: Pure Genius: The Complete Atlantic Recordings (1952–1959) (Atlantic)
2009: Genius! The Ultimate Ray Charles Collection (Concord)
2011: Singular Genius: The Complete ABC Singles (Concord)
2011: The Complete Early Recordings 1949–1952 (JSP Records)
2017: An Introduction to Ray Charles (Atlantic)
2020: One Two Three Songs
2021: True Genius (Tangerine) 6-CD 'limited edition' boxed set

Singles

Down Beat, Swing Beat, Swing Time releases
1949: The McSon Trio ( Maxin Trio and Maxim Trio):
"I Love You, I Love You (I Will Never Let You Go)" / "Confession Blues"
"Confession Blues" reached No. 2 on the U.S. R&B charts.
"Blues Before Sunrise" / "How Long Blues"
"A Sentimental Blues" / "You'll Never Miss the Water (Until the Well's Gone Dry)"
"Alone in the City" / "Can Anyone Ask for More?"
"Rockin' Chair Blues" / "Let's Have a Ball" (a.k.a. "Here I Am")
"If I Give You My Love" / "This Love of Mine" (a.k.a. "The Honey Bee")
"Ain't That Fine" / "Don't Put All Your Dreams in One Basket"

1949–1953: Ray Charles, The Ray Charles Trio:
"I've Had My Fun (Going Down Slow)" / "Sitting on Top of the World (Now She's Gone)" (1949)
"See See Rider" / "What Have I Done?" (1950)
"She's on the Ball" / "Honey, Honey" (1950)
"Th' Ego Song" ("Sweet as Can Be") / "Late in the Evening" (1950)
"Some Day" (a.k.a. "Worried Life Blues"/"Someday Baby") / "I'll Do Anything but Work" (1950)
"I Wonder Who's Kissing Her Now" / "All to Myself" (1951)
"Lonely Boy" / "Baby Let Me Hold Your Hand" (1951)
"Baby Let Me Hold Your Hand" reached No. 5 on the U.S. R&B charts.
"I'm Glad for Your Sake" / "Kissa Me Baby" (1952)
"Kissa Me Baby" reached No. 8 on the U.S. R&B charts.
"Baby Won't You Please Come Home" / "Hey Now" (1952)
"Baby Let Me Hear You Call My Name" / "Guitar Blues" (B-side by Rufus Beacham Orchestra) (1952)
"I Can't Do No More" / "Roly Poly" (a.k.a. "Back Home") (B-side by Rufus Beacham Orchestra) (1952)
"Walkin' and Talkin' to Myself" / "I'm Wonderin' and Wonderin'" (1952)
"Misery in My Heart" / "The Snow Is Falling (Snowfall)" (1953)

Atlantic releases
The list of singles below are songs Ray Charles released while on the Atlantic label between 1952 and 1980.

ABC releases
This list below is of songs Ray Charles released on the ABC-Paramount, ABC, and subsidiary Impulse and Tangerine/TRC labels from 1960 to 1973.

AThrough a period between November 1963 and January 1965, Billboard Magazine did not publish an R&B singles chart. Positions shown are from the Cashbox RnB Charts during this period.

CrossOver releases
This list below is of songs Ray Charles released while on the CrossOver label from 1973 to 1976.

Columbia releases (all country music)
Listed below are songs Ray Charles released during his Columbia Records tenure which was spent on the country singles chart.

Other releases
Listed below are songs Ray Charles issued on various labels where the pop and R&B charts are concerned.

Billboard Year-End performances

Video performances

O Genio – Live in Brazil 1963 (Rhino) 1963 São Paulo performance
The Dick Cavett Show – Ray Charles Collection (Shout! Factory Theatre) 1972 and 1973 TV appearances
Soul of the Holy Land (Xenon) 1973 Israel tour
Ray Charles Live – In Concert with the Edmonton Symphony (Eagle Rock) 1981 performance
Ray Charles – 50 Years in Music (Image Entertainment) 1991 Pasadena, CA performance
Live at Montreux, 1997 (Eagle Rock, Sunset Home Visual Entertainment)
Ray Charles, Live at the Olympia, 2000 (XIII Bis) 2000 Paris performance
Ray Charles in Concert (with special guest Diane Schuur) (Image Entertainment) 1999 Miami, FL 'Lighthouse for the Blind' benefit
Ray Charles Celebrates a Gospel Christmas with Voices of Jubilation (Urban Works, Medialink Entertainment, LLC) 2002 Green Bay, WI performance
The Legend Lives On (Immortal)  video compilation of various performances

References

External links
Album Discography at RayCharles.com
[ Ray Charles Discography] at AllMusic.
Robert Christgau reviews of several Charles albums
Ray Charles lyrics at Yahoo! Music
Atlantic Records discography at jazzdisco.org
ABC-Paramount Records discography at bsnpubs.com

Discography
Discographies of American artists
Pop music discographies
Rock music discographies
Rhythm and blues discographies